Suakim (เสือคิม) is a Thai Muay Thai fighter. He is a 3-division Lumpinee Stadium champion, having won titles at bantamweight, super bantamweight, and super featherweight. 

Aside from the Thai stadium circuit, Suakim has also fought in Japan's RISE World Series in 2019.

Titles and accomplishments
The Battle Of Muaythai (BOM)
2019 BOM Super Lightweight 63kg Champion

Lumpinee Stadium
2018 Lumpinee Stadium 130lbs Champion
2014 Lumpinee Stadium 122lbs Champion
2013 Lumpinee Stadium 118lbs Champion

Professional Boxing Association of Thailand (PAT) 
2016 Thailand 122lbs Champion

Channel 7 Boxing Stadium
2014 Channel 7 Stadium 122lbs Champion

Fight record

|-  style="background:#cfc;"
| 2019-12-08||Win||align=left| Chan Hyung Lee || BOM 2-6～THE Battle Of Muaythai SEASON II vol.6 || Tokyo, Japan || TKO (Corner Stoppage) || 3 || 3:00
|-
! style=background:white colspan=9 |
|-  style="background:#fbb;"
| 2019-11-07|| Loss ||align=left| Superlek Kiatmuu9|| Ruamponkon Prachin ||Prachinburi, Thailand|| Decision ||5  ||3:00
|-  style="background:#cfc;"
| 2019-10-05||Win||align=left| Rungkit Wor.Sanprapai || Yod Muay Thai Naikhanomton || Buriram, Thailand || Decision || 5 || 3:00
|- style="background:#cfc;"
| 2019-09-16|| Win || align="left" | Nikita Sapun || Rise World Series 2019 Final Round ||Tokyo, Japan|| KO (Left middle Kick) || 1 ||
|- style="background:#fbb;"
| 2019-07-21|| Loss || align="left" | Tenshin Nasukawa || Rise World Series 2019 Semi Finals, -58kg Tournament Semi Final ||Tokyo, Japan|| TKO (Doctor Stop/Rolling thunder) || 3 || 1:25
|- style="background:#cfc;"
| 2019-06-01|| Win || align="left" | Shota SaenchaiGym || The Battle Of Muay Thai Season II vol.2 ||Tokyo, Japan|| KO (Right Cross) || 2 || 0:22
|-  style="background:#fbb;"
| 2019-04-30|| Loss ||align=left| Phet Utong Or. Kwanmuang || Lumpinee Stadium || Bangkok, Thailand || Decision || 5 || 3:00
|-  style="background:#cfc;"
| 2019-03-10|| Win ||align=left| Thalisson Gomes Ferreira || Rise World Series 2019 First Round, -58kg Tournament Quarter Final || Tokyo, Japan || KO (Front kick to the body) || 3 || 1:30
|-  style="background:#fbb;"
| 2019-02-01|| Loss ||align=left| Rungkit Morbeskamala || Lumpinee Stadium || Bangkok, Thailand || Decision || 5 || 3:00
|-  style="background:#cfc;"
| 2018-12-26|| Win ||align=left| Rungkit Morbeskamala || Rajadamnern Stadium || Bangkok, Thailand || Decision || 5 || 3:00
|-  style="background:#cfc;"
| 2018-11-17|| Win ||align=left| Ignacio Capllonch || RISE 129 || Tokyo, Japan || Decision (Unanimous)|| 3 || 3:00
|-  style="background:#cfc;"
| 2018-11-09|| Win ||align=left| Yok Parunchai || Lumpinee Stadium || Bangkok, Thailand || KO (Punches)|| 3 ||
|-  style="background:#cfc;"
| 2018-09-07|| Win ||align=left| Teppabut Phetkiatphet || Lumpinee Stadium || Bangkok, Thailand || Decision || 5 ||  
|-
! style=background:white colspan=9 |
|-  style="background:#cfc;"
| 2018-07-10|| Win ||align=left| Pataktep Sinbeemuaythai || Lumpinee Stadium || Bangkok, Thailand || KO (Punches) || 5 ||
|-  style="background:#cfc;"
| 2018-06-05|| Win ||align=left| Mongkolpetch Petchyindee || Lumpinee Stadium || Bangkok, Thailand || Decision || 5 ||
|-  style="background:#fbb;"
| 2018-03-28|| Loss||align=left| Rodtang Jitmuangnon || WanParunchai + Poonseua Sanjorn  || Nakhon Si Thammarat, Thailand || Decision || 5 ||
|-  style="background:#fbb;"
| 2018-02-12|| Loss ||align=left| Tenshin Nasukawa || KNOCK OUT First Impact || Tokyo, Japan || Decision || 5 || 3:00
|-  style="background:#cfc;"
| 2018-01-09|| Win ||align=left| Nawapon Lukpakrit || Lumpinee Stadium || Bangkok, Thailand || KO (Left Elbow) || 4 ||
|-  style="background:#cfc;"
| 2017-11-01|| Win ||align=left| Petchdam PetchyindeeAcademy || Rajadamnern Stadium || Bangkok, Thailand || Decision || 5 || 3:00
|-  style="background:#cfc;"
| 2017-07-14|| Win ||align=left| Mongkolpetch Petchyindee || Ruamponkonsamui + Kiatpetch || Koh Samui, Thailand || KO (Left Hook)|| 4 ||
|-  style="background:#fbb;"
| 2017-06-09|| Loss ||align=left| Mongkolpetch Petchyindee || Lumpinee Stadium || Bangkok, Thailand || Decision || 5 || 3:00
|-
! style=background:white colspan=9 |
|-  style="background:#cfc;"
| 2017-04-04|| Win ||align=left| Phetmorakot Teeded99 || Lumpinee Stadium || Bangkok, Thailand || KO (Punches & elbow) || 4 ||
|-  style="background:#cfc;"
| 2017-02-02|| Win ||align=left| Petdam Gaiyanghadao || Lumpinee Stadium || Bangkok, Thailand || Decision || 5 || 3:00
|-  style="background:#cfc;"
| 2016-09-30|| Win ||align=left| Chalam Parunchai || Lumpinee Stadium || Bangkok, Thailand || Decision || 5 || 3:00
|-  bgcolor="#cfc"
! style=background:white colspan=9 |
|-  style="background:#fbb;"
| 2016-07-08|| Loss ||align=left| Luknimit Singklongsi|| Lumpinee Stadium || Bangkok, Thailand || Decision || 5 || 3:00
|-  style="background:#cfc;"
| 2016-06-12|| Win ||align=left| Luknimit Singklongsi|| Channel 7 Boxing Stadium || Bangkok, Thailand || Decision || 5 || 3:00
|-  style="background:#cfc;"
| 2016-04-05|| Win ||align=left| Tingtong Kiatjaroenchai  || Lumpinee Stadium || Bangkok, Thailand || Decision || 5 || 3:00
|-  style="background:#fbb;"
| 2016-01-09|| Loss ||align=left| Jemsak Sakburiram || Lumpinee Stadium || Bangkok, Thailand || Decision || 5 || 3:00
|-  style="background:#cfc;"
| 2015-11-21|| Win ||align=left| Sakulchai Veronafarm  ||  || Uthai Thani, Thailand || Decision || 5 || 3:00
|-  style="background:#cfc;"
| 2015-10-30|| Win ||align=left| Mongkolchai Kwaitonggym  || Lumpinee Stadium || Bangkok, Thailand || KO (Punches) || 3 ||
|-  style="background:#cfc;"
| 2015-08-07|| Win ||align=left| Sakulchailek Por.Lakboon  || Lumpinee Stadium || Bangkok, Thailand || Decision || 5 || 3:00
|-  style="background:#fbb;"
| 2015-06-28|| Loss ||align=left| Mongkolchai Kwaitonggym  || Channel 7 Boxing Stadium || Bangkok, Thailand || Decision || 5 || 3:00
|-  bgcolor="#cfc"
! style=background:white colspan=9 |
|-  style="background:#cfc;"
| 2015-05-12|| Win ||align=left| Kaotam Lookprabaht || Lumpinee Stadium || Bangkok, Thailand || Decision || 5 || 3:00
|-  style="background:#cfc;"
| 2015-02-08|| Win ||align=left| Kongkiat Tor Pran 49 ||  Channel 7 Boxing Stadium || Bangkok, Thailand || Decision || 5 || 3:00
|-  style="background:#cfc;"
| 2014-12-21|| Win ||align=left| Choknumchai Sitjakong || Channel 7 Boxing Stadium || Bangkok, Thailand || Decision || 5 || 3:00
|-  bgcolor="#cfc"
! style=background:white colspan=9 |
|-  style="background:#fbb;"
| 2014-10-31|| Loss ||align=left| Panpayak Jitmuangnon || Lumpinee Stadium || Bangkok, Thailand || Decision || 5 || 3:00
|-  style="background:#cfc;"
| 2014-10-07|| Win ||align=left| Chalongchai Sor.Rajabuth || Lumpinee Stadium || Bangkok, Thailand || Decision || 5 || 3:00
|-  style="background:#cfc;"
| 2014-09-07|| Win ||align=left| Taladkek Sagsamrit || Channel 7 Boxing Stadium|| Bangkok, Thailand || KO || 4 ||
|-  style="background:#fbb;"
| 2014-08-08|| Loss ||align=left| Panpayak Jitmuangnon || Lumpinee Stadium || Bangkok, Thailand || Decision || 5 || 3:00
|- 
! style=background:white colspan=9 |
|-  style="background:#cfc;"
| 2014-06-06|| Win ||align=left| Chalongchai Kiatcharoenchai || Lumpinee Stadium || Bangkok, Thailand || Decision || 5 || 3:00
|-  style="background:#cfc;"
| 2014-05-02|| Win ||align=left| Chalamkao Kiatchalermpop || Lumpinee Stadium || Bangkok, Thailand || KO || 3 ||
|-  style="background:#fbb;"
| 2014-04-08|| Loss ||align=left| Chalongchai Kiatcharoenchai || Lumpinee Stadium || Bangkok, Thailand || Decision || 5 || 3:00
|-  style="background:#cfc;"
| 2013-11-08|| Win ||align=left| Sankeng Kelasport || Lumpinee Stadium || Bangkok, Thailand || Decision || 5 || 3:00
|-  style="background:#cfc;"
| 2013-09-06|| Win ||align=left| Mondam Sor Werapon || Lumpinee Stadium || Bangkok, Thailand || Decision || 5 || 3:00
|-  bgcolor="#cfc"
! style=background:white colspan=9 |
|-  style="background:#cfc;"
| 2013-08-05|| Win ||align=left| Chorfah Tor.Sangtiennoi || Lumpinee Stadium || Bangkok, Thailand || KO (Right Elbow) || 4 ||
|-  style="background:#fbb;"
| 2013-07-09|| Loss ||align=left| Lamnampong Noomjeantawana || Lumpinee Stadium || Bangkok, Thailand || Decision || 5 || 3:00
|-  style="background:#fbb;"
| 2013-06-04|| Loss ||align=left| Mongkolchai Kwaitonggym || Lumpinee Stadium || Bangkok, Thailand || Decision || 5 || 3:00
|-  style="background:#cfc;"
| 2013-05-07|| Win ||align=left| Chokpreecha Kor.Sakuncha || Lumpinee Stadium || Bangkok, Thailand || Decision || 5 || 3:00
|-  style="background:#cfc;"
| 2013-03-22|| Win ||align=left| Satanfah Eminentair || Lumpinee Stadium || Bangkok, Thailand || Decision|| 5 || 3:00
|-  style="background:#cfc;"
| 2013-02-05|| Win ||align=left| Muangthai PKSaenchaimuaythaigym || Lumpinee Stadium || Bangkok, Thailand || TKO (Punches) || 3 || 
|-  style="background:#cfc;"
| 2012-11-04|| Win ||align=left| Kongkrai Kiatjaroenchai || Channel 7 Boxing Stadium || Bangkok, Thailand || Decision || 5 || 3:00
|-  style="background:#cfc;"
| 2012-10-07|| Win ||align=left| Khaosanit Sor.Yingcharoenkarnchang || Channel 7 Boxing Stadium || Bangkok, Thailand || Decision || 5 || 3:00
|-  style="background:#fbb;"
| 2012-08-25|| Loss ||align=left| Chingridthong Por.Worasing || Omnoi Boxing Stadium || Bangkok, Thailand || Decision || 5 || 3:00
|-  style="background:#fbb;"
| 2012-07-15|| Loss ||align=left| Talatkhaek Saksamrit  || Channel 7 Stadium || Bangkok, Thailand || Decision || 5 || 3:00
|-  style="background:#cfc;"
| 2012-06-05|| Win ||align=left| Yothin SakaethongResort || Lumpinee Stadium || Bangkok, Thailand ||  Decision || 5 || 3:00
|-  style="background:#fbb;"
| 2012-03-18|| Loss ||align=left| Jingridtong Por.Worasing|| Channel 7 Stadium || Bangkok, Thailand || Decision || 5 || 3:00
|-  style="background:#fbb;"
| 2011-10-11|| Loss ||align=left| Muangthai PKSaenchaimuaythaigym   || Lumpinee Stadium || Bangkok, Thailand || Decision || 5 || 3:00
|-  style="background:#fbb;"
| 2011-09-06|| Loss ||align=left| Muangthai PKSaenchaimuaythaigym || Lumpinee Stadium || Bangkok, Thailand || Decision || 5 || 3:00

|-  style="background:#c5d2ea;"
| 2011-07-22|| Draw ||align=left| Muangthai PKSaenchaimuaythaigym || Lumpinee Stadium || Bangkok, Thailand || Decision || 5 || 3:00 
|-  style="background:#fbb;"
| 2011-06-28|| Loss ||align=left| Muangthai PKSaenchaimuaythaigym || Lumpinee Stadium || Bangkok, Thailand || Decision || 5 || 3:00 
|-
| colspan=9 | Legend:

References

Suakim PK Saenchaimuaythaigym
Bantamweight kickboxers 
Featherweight kickboxers 
1995 births
Living people
Suakim PK Saenchaimuaythaigym